Reza Darvishi (born 20 November 1986 in Andimeshk, Iran) is an Iranian football midfielder, who currently plays for Esteghlal Khuzestan in the Persian Gulf Pro League.

References

Living people
Iranian footballers
Naft Masjed Soleyman F.C. players
1986 births
People from Andimeshk
Persian Gulf Pro League players
Malavan players
Association football midfielders
Sportspeople from Khuzestan province